Elihu Anthony (born 30 November 1818 in Greenfield, New York – died on 15 August 1905 in Santa Cruz, California) was a California pioneer, blacksmith, industrialist, landowner and Methodist minister. He is considered a founding father of the city of Santa Cruz. He also served as a member of the California State Assembly 6th District, 1880–1881. He was active within the anti-Chinese movement, and is directly connected to the systemic and racist land theft of downtown Santa Cruz from the Chinese and Black community

History 
Born 30 November 1818 in Greenfield, in Saratoga County, New York to Asa and Sarah (née Odell) Anthony, they moved often in his childhood and eventually landed in Indiana. His family were Quakers and he was raised as a Quaker. Prior to moving West, Anthony worked in Indiana as a Methodist minister. In 1845, Anthony married Sarah A. Van Anda in at Fort Wayne, Indiana.

The family emigrated in 1847 on the Oregon Trail, leaving the main route for California. They took a Northern route of travel and decided to change course and head to California, despite the danger and crossing Donner Pass where one year prior in November 1846, the Donner family had died. They were hungry and struggled but made the journey and first arriving at Sutter's Fort and later at the Pueblo of San Jose (later known as the city of San Jose, California). Anthony helped establish the San Jose First United Methodist Church which was founded in 1847.

Anthony arrived in Santa Cruz between December 1847 and January 1848 to work as a local Methodist Episcopal Church preacher. In the early years he bought a 18-acre lot of land, for which he held the title Alcalde. His land spanned what is now the downtown of Santa Cruz (the main area of the lot was near what is now the junction of Mission Street, Water Street and N. Pacific Avenue in downtown, the building no longer exists) and eventually developed the first commercial block in Santa Cruz called the Anthony Block. He built the first business, a blacksmith shop and sawmill that later became a general store. He invested in building real estate on a hill called "Anthony's Bluff" since uneven land was less preferred by the local Native Americans. When the Gold rush started in 1848, Anthony started manufacturing the pickaxes and other tools for mining, and since there were a limited amount of ironworkers in California during this time he made a great profit.

In 1849 Anthony help build with industrialist Henry Cowell the first wharf, Cowell Wharf which was primarily used for shipping lumber and lime. It was later preceded by six other wharfs in a similar location, currently the only remaining one is the Santa Cruz Wharf.

He was an abolitionist and a supporter of the Union Army during the American Civil War from 1861 until 1865.

Starting in 1865, Anthony with Frederick A. Hihn built the first private water supply network in the city of Santa Cruz and serving nearby communities.

Anthony had been the president of the local branch of the Workingmen's club, a group supporting the Workingmen's Party of California. The Workingmen's club introduced the anti-Chinese movement to the masses, because it was related to issues around cheap labor at the time. This sentiment led eventually to the Chinese Exclusion Act of 1882. However, by 1885 it was a larger movement called the "Non-Partisan Anti-Chinese Association" headed by Anthony and Duncan McPherson, editor and publisher of the Santa Cruz Sentinel spread down the coast to local cities and towns.

He died on 15 August 1905 at age 86 and is buried in Santa Cruz Memorial Park Cemetery.

See also 
 Santa Cruz Museum of Art and History

References

External links 
 

1818 births
1905 deaths
History of the San Francisco Bay Area
Anti-Chinese sentiment in the United States
American abolitionists
Activists from California
Methodist evangelists
People of the California Gold Rush
Workingmen's Party of California people
People from Santa Cruz County, California
Methodist abolitionists
American white supremacists
People of Alta California